Lorenzo Valentini (born 13 April 1991) is an Italian sprinter, specialized in the 400 metres.

Biography
Lorenzo Valentini won a medal at the 2013 Mediterranean Games.

Achievements

National titles
He has won 2 times the individual national championship.
2 wins in 400 metres indoor (2011, 2012)

See also
 Italy at the 2013 Mediterranean Games

References

External links
 

1991 births
Athletics competitors of Fiamme Gialle
Italian male sprinters
Living people
People from Rieti
Mediterranean Games gold medalists for Italy
Athletes (track and field) at the 2013 Mediterranean Games
Mediterranean Games medalists in athletics
Sportspeople from the Province of Rieti